Camp is a 2003 American musical comedy-drama film, written and directed by Todd Graff, about an upstate New York performing arts summer camp. The film is based on Graff's own experiences at a similar camp called Stagedoor Manor, where many scenes of the movie were filmed.

Plot
The film centers on the experiences of several teenagers at Camp Ovation, a summer theatre camp. Shy Ellen Lucas greets her friend Michael Flores, a gay teenager who was violently beaten by his classmates after showing up to his junior prom in drag. Nerdy Fritzi Wagner attempts to befriend icy Jill Simmons, but ends up toting her luggage instead. Returning camper Jenna Malloran laments that her parents forced her to have her jaw wired shut in order to lose weight. The campers are surprised by the arrival of Vlad Baumann, a handsome new camper who is, as a staff member marvels, "an honest-to-god straight boy." The camp enlists a guest counselor for the summer: composer Bert Hanley, whose play "The Children's Crusade" was a one-hit wonder many years earlier. Frustrated with his lack of recent success, he is now a grumpy alcoholic.

Vlad and Ellen flirt a bit after rehearsal one day. Soon afterward, Vlad is seduced by Jill, who later makes cruel cracks at Ellen for her weight and her inexperience with boys. Feeling guilty, Vlad comforts Ellen and the two begin to inch toward a relationship.

After Fritzi is caught washing Jill's underwear, Jill expresses her disgust with Fritzi and kicks her out of the cabin. Enraged, Fritzi sabotages Jill's next performance and takes her place mid-song, revealing her previously hidden talent.

Vlad convinces Michael to invite his parents to his next play. When they fail to show, Michael flees the stage mid-performance. Vlad reveals to Michael that he has his own hidden problem: Vlad has Obsessive Compulsive Disorder and must take medication to make life bearable.

Hanley gets into a drunken rage and tells the campers that theater will only make them bitter and lonely like himself. Vlad finds a trove of music that Hanley has written over the years but not released. During a rehearsal for the camp's benefit performance, Vlad and the campers sing one of Hanley's songs. Hanley's heart is lifted and his disposition changes.

Shortly before the benefit, Michael sleeps with Dee, Ellen's roommate, out of frustration about his unrequited crush on Vlad. Vlad and Dee end up making out on Dee's bed, and Ellen walks in on them. She runs off, hurt, and refuses to talk to Vlad.

The night of the benefit concert arrives, and the campers are starstruck as famed composer Stephen Sondheim is in attendance. The dressing room atmosphere is tense, and gets even more awkward when Vlad's girlfriend Julie shows up to see him. Fritzi sabotages Jill's makeup, causing her to break out in boils. Jill attacks her, injuring her, and both are unfit to go onstage. To replace her, Bert cuts the wires on Jenna's mouth, allowing her to sing a powerful song directed to her parents in the audience, telling them to accept her as she is.

The benefit is a hit, but Vlad, Michael, and Ellen are still arguing. Vlad admits that he is an "attention junkie" and attempts to please everyone in order to gain their good favor. Vlad explains that he still cares about Ellen and that his girlfriend Julie had just broken up with him. After another apology, Ellen forgives him, and the three go swimming.

Cast
 Daniel Letterle as Vlad Baumann
 Joanna Chilcoat as Ellen Lucas
 Robin de Jesús as Michael Flores
 Anna Kendrick as Fritzi Wagner
 Alana Allen as Jill Simmons
 Vince Rimoldi as Spitzer
 Don Dixon as Bert Hanley
 Tiffany Taylor as Jenna Malloran
 Sasha Allen as Dee
 Eddie Clark and Leslie Frye as Mr. and Mrs. Malloran
 David Perlow as Ben Lucas
 DeQuina Moore as DeQuina
 Steven Cutts as Shaun
 Stephen Sondheim as himself

The movie is notable as the film debut of future Academy Award nominee Anna Kendrick, future three-time Tony nominee Robin de Jesús, future The Voice contestant Sasha Allen, and future Broadway performers DeQuina Moore and Steven Cutts.

Production
The film was produced by Jersey Films, IFC Films, John Wells Productions, Killer Films, and Laughlin Park Pictures. All production took place in New York.

Soundtrack

The movie notably features a song co-written by Michael Gore, who had previously won the Academy Award For Best Original Song and the Academy Award For Best Original Score (both from the 1980 film, Fame).

Reception

Box office
In the opening weekend, the film made $54,294. It came in ranking at #45, showing at only 3 theaters in the United States and averaging $18,098. The film's widest release took place in the UK where it showed in 116 theaters. It ran for 12 weeks and closed on October 16, 2003. It has grossed $1,629,862 since 2003. The film also hit several top 100 charts for films in numerous categories. It is number 96 in the genre of gay/lesbian independent films, 78 for yearly PG-13 movies for 2003, and ranked 198 for the year 2003.

Critical response
On Rotten Tomatoes, the film has a 64% approval rating, based on 107 reviews with an average rating of 5.93/10. The website's critical consensus states: "Campy comedy that squeaks by on its charms." On Metacritic, which uses a weighted average of critics' reviews, the film has a score of 55 out of 100 based on 32 reviews, indicating "mixed or average reviews".

Margaret A. McGurk of The Cincinnati Enquirer says "Like the prodigies on screen, Camp powers through its imperfections, with irresistible results."
James Sullivan of the San Francisco Chronicle said in his review titled "Camp," "There is lots of music and a genuine showstopper when Jenna sings "Here's Where I Stand" with such emotion that even her hardheaded dad gets the message." In Newsweek, David Ansen wrote, "Camp may not be as slick as Fame, but it's twice as funny and loads more honest."

Award nominations
Camp received nominations for the following awards:
 2004, Nominated for Artiors Award for Best Casting for Feature Film, Independent, Bernard Telsey
 2004, Nominated for Independent Spirit Award for Best Debut Performance, Anna Kendrick
 2004, Nominated for Golden Satellite Award for Best Original Score, Stephen Trask, and Best Original Song, Bob Telson and Lee Breuer (For the song “How Shall I See You Through My Tears”)
 2003, Nominated for Grand Jury Prize for Dramatic at the Sundance Film Festival, Todd Graff

Sequel
Todd Graff promoted an Indiegogo campaign in 2015 to fund a sequel. Rather than treat the original as a previous year at Camp Ovation, the plot would frame Camp as a movie filmed on the campgrounds.

References

External links
 
 
 
 
 

2003 films
2003 independent films
2003 LGBT-related films
2000s musical comedy-drama films
2000s teen comedy-drama films
American independent films
American musical comedy-drama films
American teen comedy-drama films
American teen LGBT-related films
American teen musical films
Cross-dressing in American films
2000s English-language films
Films about actors
Films directed by Todd Graff
Films produced by Christine Vachon
Films produced by Danny DeVito
Films scored by Stephen Trask
Films set in New York (state)
Films shot in New York (state)
Gay-related films
Killer Films films
LGBT-related musical comedy-drama films
2000s Spanish-language films
Films about summer camps
2003 directorial debut films
LGBT-related coming-of-age films
2000s American films